| demographics2_title1    = Income per capita (US dollars)
| demographics2_info1     = 
| demographics2_title2    = Poverty rate
| demographics2_info2     = 
| demographics2_title3    = Literacy
| demographics2_info3     = 51.64 
| demographics2_title4    = Life Expectancy
| demographics2_info4     =

| timezone1               = NPT
| utc_offset1             = +05:45

| website                 = 
| footnotes               = 
}}
Bungal is a municipality located in Bajhang District of Sudurpashchim province of Nepal. It is surrounded by Darchula District in the west, Baitadi District in the south, Surma, Chabispathivera, Durgathali, Kedarseu and Bithadchir in the East and Saipal touches it from the North.

On 10 March 2017 Government of Nepal announced 744 local level units as per the new constitution of Nepal 2015. thus this local level unit came into existence. The municipality is divided into 11 wards. Dahbagar, Khidatari, Deulikot, Pipalkot and Kaflaseri are the previous villages which were merged to form this new local level unit.

Atpali Village is a village in Bungal municipality, and also the ancestral place of Kamalbathyal house.

References

External links
http://mofald.gov.np/sites/default/files/News_Notices/Final%20District%201-75%20Corrected%20Last%20for%20RAJPATRA.pdf
https://web.archive.org/web/20180831065451/http://103.69.124.141/
http://kathmandupost.ekantipur.com/news/2017-08-11/govt-prepares-to-add-9-more-local-levels-in-province-2.html
https://www.citypopulation.de/php/nepal-mun-admin.php?adm2id=6802

Municipalities in Bajhang District
Municipalities of Nepal
Nepal municipalities established in 2017